Hermann Erdlen (16 July 1893 – 30 June 1972) was a German composer.

Life 
Born in Hamburg, Erdlen received his musical education at the Bernuth Conservatory in his native town and through studies with Emil Krause (composition), Goby Eberhardt (violin), Karl Goltermann (piano and organ) and Wilhelm Vilmar (singing). Like Erwin Lendvai, he was active in the Lobeda Movement founded by Carl Hannemann, whose members were later particularly fond of his Deutsches Requiem and the Saar-Kantate. The first song compositions by him appeared as early as 1910. From 1928, he taught music theory, historical musicology and instrumentation at the Hansische  and at the Institut für Lehrerfortbildung in Hamburg. Since 1 May 1937, Erdlen was a member of the NSDAP (member number: 4.956.880). From 1945 onwards, he worked as a freelance artist and music writer in Hamburg.

Erdlen wrote works for orchestral and chamber music ensembles, works for (amateur) choir, solo songs and also stage music.

Erdlen died in Hamburg at the age of 78.

Work 
Orchestral work
 Passacaglia und Fuge
 Finnische Tänze
 Konzertouvertüre BBC

Chamber music
 Sonate in D für Violine und Klavier
 Chaconne für Violine und Orgel
 Thema und 12 Variationen über "Der Winter ist vergangen"

Choral work
 Zeit zu Zeit
 Requiem für die Gefallenen
 "Aber dies, aber das", ein Löns-Liederspiel

Stage music
 Der Gaukler und das Klingelspiel
 Alpenkönig und Menschenfeind
 1000 Jahre Hamburg

Others
 88 Spielübungen für die diatonische harmonica

References

External links 
 
 

20th-century classical composers
German composers
1893 births
1972 deaths
Musicians from Hamburg
Nazi Party members